Molinieae is a tribe of grasses, containing 11 genera, including reed (Phragmites) and moor-grass (Molinia).

Subtribes and genera
Subtribe Crinipinae
Crinipes
Elytrophorus
Pratochloa
Styppeiochloa

Subtribe Moliniinae
Hakonechloa
Molinia
Moliniopsis
Phragmites

incertae sedis
Leptagrostis
Piptophyllum
Zenkeria

References

 
Poaceae tribes